Agente 3S3: Passaporto per l'inferno or Agent 3S3:Passport to Hell is a 1965 Italian adventure-eurospy film directed by Sergio Sollima, here credited as Simon Sterling. This is the first chapter in the Sollima's spy film trilogy, and inaugurated the film series of the Agent 3S3 played by George Ardisson.  It is also the first Sollima's full-length film, after the episode he filmed in L'amore difficile three years before.

Location filming includes Spain, Rome, Beirut and Vienna. This was followed by the sequel Agent 3S3, Massacre in the Sun (1966) also directed by Sollima that was shot back to back.

Cast
George Ardisson ...  Walter Ross, Agent 3S3
Barbara Simon ...  Irmgard von Wittstein
José Marco ...  Ahmed
Georges Rivière ...  Professor Steve Dickson
 ...  Bellamy (as Frank Andrews)
Liliane Fernani ...  Karina (as Senta Heller)
Seyna Seyn ...  Jackye Vein
Charles Kalinski ...  Salkoff (as Karl Wirth)
Francisco Sanz ...  Nobell (as Paco Sanz / Paul Fabian)
Henri Cogan ...  Sanz (as Heinrich Rauch)
Fernando Sancho ...  Colonel Dolukin (as Ferdinand Bergmann)
Béatrice Altariba ...  Elisa von Sloot
Sal Borgese ...  Man in Vienna Bar
Jeff Cameron

Reception
In a contemporary review, the Monthly Film Bulletin stated that ″attractive locations...are small compensation for the general stodginess of the latest cosmopolitan spy thriller. After a promising beginning, with the hero's car sandwiched between two huge lorries on a snow-bound country road, the plot resolves itself into the customary round of brawls and brawn.″

References

External links 
 

1965 films
1960s Italian-language films
Italian spy thriller films
1965 adventure films
1960s spy thriller films
Films directed by Sergio Sollima
Films scored by Piero Umiliani
Italian adventure films
1960s Italian films